The HQ-22 is a medium- to long-range semi-active radar homing/radio-command guidance air defence system developed and manufactured in China.

Development
The HQ-22 air defence system was developed as the second generation of the HQ-12 missile. The HQ-22 is manufactured by Jiangnan Space Industry, also known as Base 061, which is a part of the China Aerospace Science and Industry Corporation (CASIC).

In 2014, a downgraded form of the missile known as the FK-3 was revealed, targeting export customers.

At the 2016 Airshow China, the HQ-22 was first publicly revealed as an improved version of the FK-3.

In 2017, the HQ-22 entered service in the People's Liberation Army and has rapidly become one of the main missiles used for air defence.

Design
A typical HQ-22 battery includes one radar vehicle and three transporter erector launchers equipped with four missiles each. Each battery can reportedly engage six aerial targets simultaneously.

The missile system has been widely compared to the United States' Patriot and Russia's mobile long range S-300 surface-to-air missile system. Although it has a shorter range than S-300 variants such as the S-300PMU-2, it is thought to benefit from superior electronic countermeasures (ECM) and superior capabilities against stealth targets at shorter ranges.

The system is believed to be much less expensive than the HQ-9 also in service and will be one of the mainstays of China's air defense network, replacing the HQ-2 missiles of the Cold War era.

Missile
The system's missiles are guided by semi-active radar guidance and can engage ballistic and cruise missiles, aircraft, helicopters and unmanned aerial vehicles.

One main difference of the HQ-22 from its predecessor HQ-12 is that the HQ-22 has a new "wingless" design.

Radar
The system is capable of launching 12 missiles to engage up to six targets simultaneously, and engage up to 36 targets with 72 missiles when multiple fire units, under the control of a command and coordination vehicle, are used.

The missile can use either semi-active radar homing composite guidance or radio-command guidance through the whole course. Initially, the missile will use semi-active radar homing guidance and in the case that it encounters strong electronic interference, will automatically change to radio-command guidance.

Launch vehicle
The launcher vehicles are based on a 8×8 configuration chassis manufactured by the Hanyang Special Purpose Vehicle Institute. The HQ-22 launches its missiles at an angle, unlike the HQ-9 and HQ-16 which launch their missiles vertically.

Variants
FK-3: Original export variant.

Deployment 
In 2017, the HQ-22 entered service in the People's Liberation Army and has rapidly become one of the country's primary air defence systems.

In August 2020, it was announced that Serbia had purchased the FK-3, surprising many in the Russian media, who had expected the country to purchase the S-300 instead. It was the first time that any Chinese medium- or long-range air defence system had been exported to a European country.

It was reported in April that HQ-22s had been deployed by the PLA near Indian territory in the eastern Ladakh area.

On 9 April 2022, multiple People's Liberation Army Air Force Xi'an Y-20 transport aircraft landed in Belgrade to deliver the FK-3 to the Serbian Air Force and Air Defence. On 30 April 2022, the Serbian Ministry of Defence showed the first pictures of the FK-3 officially brought into service.

Operators

People's Liberation Army Air Force - 100+ as of 2020
 
Tatmadaw

Serbian Armed Forces
 
Air and Coastal Defense Command
 
Armed Forces of Turkmenistan

References

Anti-ballistic missiles of the People's Republic of China
Military equipment introduced in the 2010s
Surface-to-air missiles of the People's Republic of China